The Aurora Awards are granted annually by the Canadian SF and Fantasy Association and SFSF Boreal Inc. The Award for Best YA Novel was first awarded in 2013 as a separate category to the Best Novel category. Currently, the award has only been split for the English-language Award, and French YA novels would only be eligible for the Meilleur roman.

Charles de Lint and Fonda Lee have won the award the most number of times at twice each.

Winners and nominees

  *   Winners and joint winners

References

YA